Chishminsky District is an administrative and municipal district (raion), one of the fifty-four in the Republic of Bashkortostan, Russia. It is located in the center of the republic and borders with Kushnarenkovsky District in the north, Ufimsky District in the northeast and east, Karmaskalinsky District in the southeast, Davlekanovsky District in the south, and with Blagovarsky District in the west and northwest. Its administrative center is the urban locality (a work settlement) of Chishmy. As of the 2010 Census, the total population of the district was 52,344, with the population of the administrative center accounting for 40.5% of that number.

History
The district was established in 1930.

Administrative and municipal status
Within the framework of administrative divisions, Chishminsky District is one of the fifty-four in the Republic of Bashkortostan. It is divided into 1 settlement council (with the administrative center in the work settlement of Chishmy) and 15 selsoviets, which comprise 103 rural localities. As a municipal division, the district is incorporated as Chishminsky Municipal District. The settlement council is incorporated as an urban settlement, and the fifteen selsoviets are incorporated as fifteen rural settlements within the municipal district. The work settlement of Chishmy serves as the administrative center of both the administrative and municipal district.

References

Notes

Sources

Districts of Bashkortostan
States and territories established in 1930